The 1999 Tour de France was a multiple stage bicycle race held from 3 to 25 July, and the 86th edition of the Tour de France. It has no overall winner—although American cyclist Lance Armstrong originally won the event, the United States Anti-Doping Agency announced in August 2012 that they had disqualified Armstrong from all his results since 1998, including his seven consecutive Tour de France wins from 1999 to 2005 (which were, originally, the most wins in the event's history); the Union Cycliste Internationale confirmed the result.

There were no French stage winners for the first time since the 1926 Tour de France. Additionally, Mario Cipollini won four stages in a row, setting the post-World War II record for consecutive stage wins (breaking the record of three, set by Gino Bartali in 1948.)

Teams

After the doping controversies in the 1998 Tour de France, the Tour organisation banned some riders from the race, including Richard Virenque, Laurent Roux and Philippe Gaumont, manager Manolo Saiz and the entire  team. Virenque's team Polti then appealed at the UCI against this decision, and the UCI then forced the organisers of the Tour, Amaury Sport Organisation (ASO), to allow Virenque and Saiz entry in the Tour. Each team was allowed to field nine cyclists.

The teams entering the race were:

Qualified teams

Invited teams

Route and stages

Race overview

Following the Festina Affair of the previous year the 1999 edition was billed as the "Tour of Renewal" from the very beginning.

Doping

This tour also saw the mistreatment of Christophe Bassons by his fellow riders of the peloton (notably Armstrong) for speaking out against doping. The 1998 tour had been marred by the Festina doping scandal. Bassons later told Bicycling, "The 1999 Tour was supposed to be the "Tour of Renewal", but I was certain that doping had not disappeared." He quit the tour without finishing after "cracking" mentally due to his treatment by the peloton, especially in stage 10.

Subsequent to Armstrong's statement to withdraw his fight against United States Anti-Doping Agency's (USADA) charges, on 24 August 2012, the USADA said it would ban Armstrong for life and stripped him of his record seven Tour de France titles. Later that day it was confirmed in a USADA statement that Armstrong was banned for life and would be disqualified from any and all competitive results obtained on and subsequent to 1 August 1998, including forfeiture of any medals, titles, winnings, finishes, points and prizes. On 22 October 2012, the Union Cycliste Internationale endorsed the USADA sanctions, and decided not to award victories to any other rider or upgrade other placings in any of the affected events.

Other incidents
The 1999 edition of Tour de France had two bizarre moments. The first was on stage 2 when a 25-rider pile-up occurred at Passage du Gois. The Passage du Gois is a two-mile causeway which depending on the tide can be under water. A rider came down in the middle of the field during the passage, leading to the crash that cost pre-race favourites Alex Zülle, Christophe Rinero and Michael Boogerd more than five minutes to the lead group. The second bizarre incident was on stage 10, one kilometre from the summit of Alpe d'Huez. Leading Italian rider Giuseppe Guerini was confronted by a spectator holding a camera in the middle of the road. Guerini hit the spectator but recovered and went on to win the stage.

Classification leadership and minor prizes

There were several classifications in the 1999 Tour de France. The most important was the general classification, calculated by adding each cyclist's finishing times on each stage. The cyclist with the least accumulated time was the race leader, identified by the yellow jersey; the winner of this classification is considered the winner of the Tour.

Additionally, there was a points classification, which awarded a green jersey. In the points classification, cyclists got points for finishing among the best in a stage finish, or in intermediate sprints. The cyclist with the most points led the classification, and was identified with a green jersey.

There was also a mountains classification. The organisation had categorised some climbs as either hors catégorie, first, second, third, or fourth-category; points for this classification were won by the first cyclists that reached the top of these climbs first, with more points available for the higher-categorised climbs. The cyclist with the most points lead the classification, and wore a white jersey with red polka dots.

The fourth individual classification was the young rider classification, which was not marked by a jersey. This was decided the same way as the general classification, but only riders under 26 years were eligible.

For the team classification, the times of the best three cyclists per team on each stage were added; the leading team was the team with the lowest total time.

In addition, there was a combativity award given after each mass-start stage to the cyclist considered most combative, who wore a red number bib the next stage. The decision was made by a jury composed of journalists who gave points. The cyclist with the most points from votes in all stages led the combativity classification. Jacky Durand won this classification, and was given overall the super-combativity award. The Souvenir Henri Desgrange was given in honour of Tour founder Henri Desgrange to the first rider to pass the summit of the Col du Galibier on stage 9. This prize was won by José Luis Arrieta.

In stage 1, Alex Zülle wore the green jersey.
In stages 3 through 6, Tom Steels wore the green jersey.
In stage 7, Erik Zabel wore the green jersey.
In stage 8, Mario Cipollini wore the green jersey.

Final standings

General classification

Points classification

Mountains classification

Young rider classification

Team classification

Combativity classification

Notes

References

Bibliography

Further reading

External links

 
 1999 Tour de France at Cyclingnews.com

 
Tour de France by year
Tour de France
Tour de France
Tour de France